Durgathali (Nepali: दुर्गाथली ) is a Gaupalika(Nepali: गाउपालिका ; gaupalika) in Bajhang District in the Sudurpashchim Province of far-western Nepal. 
Durgathali has a population of 12972.The land area is 61.83 km2.

References

Rural municipalities in Bajhang District
Rural municipalities of Nepal established in 2017